Voro may refer to two different languages:

 Voro language (Adamawa) (ISO 639-3: vor) – an Adamawa language spoken in Nigeria
 Võro language (ISO 639-3: vro) – a Finnic language spoken in Estonia